The Working People's Party (POM) is a centre-left political party in Moldova.

History  
The founding congress of the party was held on 23 April 1998, when the party's program and bylaws were adopted. The Working People's Party took part in the 1999 local elections and 2001 parliamentary elections. Ion Țurcanu became the chairman of the party. It used to be known as the "New National Moldovan Party" (NPNM) and the "Party for the Union of Moldova" (alternatively the "Political Party for the Union of Moldova", PpUM). Currently, the president is Serghei Toma.

The Working People's Party tried to participate in the 2020 Moldovan presidential election, but it did not get the necessary number of signatures to be registered.

See also  
 National Moldavian Party

References

External links
Note that the names used in these links are outdated:
 New National Moldovan Party 
 La Chisinau s-a infiintat Noul Partid National al Moldovenilor 
 Partidul politic pentru Unirea Moldovei (PpUM)

1998 establishments in Moldova
Political parties established in 1998
Political parties in Moldova
Social democratic parties in Moldova